Bindu of Bukhara was Bukhar Khudah (king of Bukhara) from an unknown date to 681. Several rulers of Bukhara are known before him, however, it is not known if they were from the same dynasty. Bindu had a wife who is only known by her title of Khatun, who bore him a son named Tughshada. In 681, during the Muslim conquest of Transoxiana, Bindu was killed by the Umayyad general Salm ibn Ziyad. He was succeeded by his few months old son Tughshada.

Sources 
 
 
 
 
 

681 deaths
Year of birth unknown
Sogdian rulers
7th-century Iranian people